Symbology concerns the study of symbols.

Symbology may also refer to:

 Semiotics, study of signs and symbols
 Barcode symbology, a term used to denote a type of barcode mapping representation.
 Symbol (programming)
 Symbolic anthropology, diverse set of approaches within cultural anthropology that view culture as a symbolic system that arises primarily from human interpretations of the world
 Symbolic system, used in the field of anthropology, sociology, and psychology to refer to a system of interconnected symbolic meanings
 Symbolism (disambiguation), use of symbols to represent ideas and emotions
 Iconography, branch of art history which studies images
 Military symbology, APP-6A, Military Symbols for Land Based Systems, NATO standardization agreement

Punctuation redirects here.